Sanjiva Rao (1917 – 6 August 1966) was an Indian cricketer. He played sixteen first-class matches for Hyderabad between 1941 and 1958.

See also
 List of Hyderabad cricketers

References

External links
 

1917 births
1966 deaths
Indian cricketers
Hyderabad cricketers
Place of birth missing